Wang Ning (born August 1955) is a retired general of the People's Liberation Army of China, formerly served as commander of the People's Armed Police. Previously he served as the deputy chief of the Joint Staff. Wang is a member of the 19th Central Committee of the Chinese Communist Party.

Career 
Born Wang Luning in Nanjing, Jiangsu in August 1955, with his ancestral home in Rongcheng, Shandong.

Wang joined the People's Liberation Army in 1970 and he was serving in Nanjing Military Region. Between 1986 and 1992, he served as the commander of an artillery regiment in the 12th Group Army. During his time in command, his regiment won a large number of accolades.

In 2003, Wang was appointed as the Chief of Staff of the Shanghai Garrison. In 2006, Wang was elevated to the Commander of Jiangxi Military District, he remained in that position until December 2010, when he was transferred to Beijing and appointed the Chief of Staff of the Beijing Military Region. He was made a lieutenant general in November 2012.

In July 2013, Wang was promoted to become a Deputy General Chief of Staff of the People's Liberation Army General Staff Department In December 2014, Wang became the commander of the People's Armed Police. He had no prior experience in the armed police, so his appointment came as somewhat of a surprise. He retired in December 2020.

On February 28, 2021, he was appointed vice-chairperson of the National People's Congress Constitution and Law Committee.

Wang was a delegate to the 17th National Congress of the Chinese Communist Party and an alternate member of the 18th Central Committee of the Chinese Communist Party. He was made a full member of the 19th Central Committee of the Chinese Communist Party in 2017, and remained a full member during the 20th Central Committee.

References 

1955 births
Living people
People from Nanjing
Commanders of the People's Armed Police
People's Liberation Army generals from Jiangsu
Members of the 19th Central Committee of the Chinese Communist Party
Alternate members of the 18th Central Committee of the Chinese Communist Party